Mar Emmanuel III Delly (27 September 1927 – 8 April 2014) was the Patriarch Emeritus of Babylon of the Chaldeans and former Primate of the Chaldean Catholic Church, an Eastern Catholic sui juris particular church of the Catholic Church, and also a cardinal. He was born in Tel Keppe and was ordained a priest on 21 December 1952. He was consecrated a bishop in December 1962 at the age of 35. He was elected Patriarch of the Chaldean Church on 3 December 2003, succeeding the late Patriarch Raphael I Bidawid. He was raised to the rank of cardinal bishop on 24 November 2007.

Birth

Karem Delly was born in Tel Keppe, in northern Iraq, on 27 September 1927 to Jarjes Murad Delly and Katrina Putros. He was baptized on 6 October 1927 by Father Francis Kattola.

Episcopal life
Since his election as Patriarch in December 2003, Mar Emmanuel III Delly continued to work for the Chaldean Church. In Iraq, the Chaldean Church, which is the largest Christian group, consists of eight dioceses totaling 100 parishes and approximately 1,000,000 people. Additionally, there are another eight dioceses outside of Iraq, in countries including Iran, Turkey, Syria, Lebanon, Egypt, Europe, Australia, Canada and the U.S. It is estimated that the Chaldean population is over one and a half million devotees worldwide. He was well known for his respect and cooperation with leaders of other churches and faiths, mainly Muslims.

During his 42 years as a bishop, Delly's contributions to the Chaldean Church include building of many churches in and outside of Iraq. He supervised the Chaldean monasteries and convents, as well as several Chaldean religious journals and publications.

On 17 October 2007, Pope Benedict XVI announced that he would make Delly a Cardinal. Delly was elevated to the College of Cardinals in the consistory at St. Peter's Basilica on November 24, 2007. Pope Benedict XVI said that by naming Delly a cardinal he was demonstrating his "spiritual closeness and [his] affection" for Iraqi Christians.

On 19 December 2012, Delly resigned as patriarch of Chaldean Catholic Church and Pope Benedict named Archeparch Jacques Ishaq as administrator ad interim. At the same time Pope Benedict convoked a synod to be held to Rome of the Chaledean Church to choose Delly's successor as patriarch.

Cardinal Delly did not participate in the 2013 conclave, having already reached age 80.

Death
Cardinal Delly died on 8 April 2014, aged 86, in San Diego, California, where he had lived in retirement. Pope Francis offered his condolences.

His funeral was held at St. Peter's Chaldean Catholic Cathedral in San Diego and at Mother of God Cathedral in Detroit. He is buried in Holy Sepulchre Catholic Cemetery in Detroit. This is the first time a Chaldean patriarch has been buried outside the homeland.

Educational degrees
Master's Degree in Philosophy, Pontifical Urbaniana University.
 Pontifical Urbaniana University—Faculty of Philosophy—Program of Studies (accessed 13 November 2007) 
Doctor of Sacred Theology, Pontifical Lateran University.
Doctor of Canon Law, Pontifical Lateran University.

Languages
Mar Emmanuel III Delly spoke Chaldean Neo-Aramaic, Syriac, Arabic, French, Italian, Latin, and English fluently.

References

External links

2004 Interview
Catholic Hierarchy.org
GigaCatholic Website

1927 births
2014 deaths
Iraqi Eastern Catholics
Chaldean Catholic Patriarchs of Babylon
People from Tel Keppe
Iraqi cardinals
Iraqi archbishops
Cardinals created by Pope Benedict XVI
Pontifical Urban University alumni
Pontifical Lateran University alumni
20th-century Eastern Catholic bishops
21st-century Eastern Catholic archbishops